The Emperor Waltz is an album of phonograph records by Bing Crosby of songs featured in his film The Emperor Waltz.

Background
This was not a soundtrack recording as Crosby recorded the songs separately some months after completing the film in September 1946. A song called "Get Yourself a Phonograph" had been recorded for the film but was eventually omitted. Crosby had previously recorded "I Kiss Your Hand, Madame" on May 24, 1929 with a trio giving support but this time he has the benefit of a full orchestral backing.  The song "The Kiss in Your Eyes" was adapted from a slow waltz called "Im Chambre séparée" ("Separate Rooms") written by Richard Heuberger. "Friendly Mountains" was arranged by Joseph J. Lilley based on original Swiss airs and the music for "Emperor Waltz" was written by Johann Strauss the younger in 1888. Johnny Burke wrote the lyrics for the last three mentioned tunes.

Reception
The album reached the No. 2 spot in the Billboard best-selling popular record albums chart on August 7, 1948. It was 9th in the year's top-selling popular record albums listing.

Track listing
These songs were featured on a 2-disc, 78 rpm album set, Decca Album No. A-620.

LP releases
The songs from A-620 were included in the 10" vinyl LP Top o' the Morning / Emperor Waltz issued by Decca Records in 1950 with catalog No. DL 5272. In 1962, the songs were also included in the Decca 12" LP But Beautiful (DL 4260) in the 15 part Bing's Hollywood series.

References

Bing Crosby albums
1948 albums
Decca Records albums